Badia a Elmi is a town in Tuscany, central Italy, administratively a frazione of the comune of San Gimignano, province of Siena. At the time of the 2001 census its population was 424.

Badia a Elmi is about 46 km from Siena and 12 km from San Gimignano.

References 

Frazioni of San Gimignano